Jamshidieh Park (or Jamshidieh Stone Garden), is a park located in the neighbourhood of Niavaran at the base of Kolakchal mountain.

History
The premises was established as a private garden by the Qajar prince and engineer Jamshid Davallu Qajar during the Pahlavi era, the garden was dedicated to Farah Diba, the empress of Iran. The Stone Garden became a public park in 1977, it was reconstructed and expanded 16 hectares with the addition of Ferdowsi garden in 1995.

Features
The stone garden's main waterfall and pond are central to the garden's design, the walk paths accommodate a network of small and narrow channels that bring water from the pond to the lower areas of the park, creating smaller water features. There are numerous restaurants, traditional teahouses (houses of culture which represent the diversity of Iran's ethnic and tribal heritage), picnic areas, and hiking trails from the lower area of the park all the way up to the top of the mountain. There is also a classically designed open air amphitheatre.

Gallery

References

Parks in Tehran